Thomas Edward Coke, 8th Earl of Leicester (born 6 July 1965), is the son of Edward Coke, 7th Earl of Leicester, and Valeria Phyllis Potter. He is the current Earl of Leicester. From 1994 to 2015, when he succeeded into the earldom, he was styled Viscount Coke.

Education and career

Lord Leicester was educated at Beeston Hall School and Eton College. Between 1979 and 1981, he was the Page of Honour to Queen Elizabeth II. He graduated from the University of Manchester with a Bachelor of Arts in the History of Art. In 1987, he was commissioned into the Scots Guards. Between 1991 and 1993, he served as Equerry to the Duke of Kent. He now runs the family estate at Holkham Hall. In 2021, he won a by-election to the House of Lords as a member of the Conservative Party, taking the oath on 20 July 2021.

Marriage and family

Lord Leicester was married on 21 December 1996 to Polly Maria Whately (born 1967), youngest daughter of the financier David Whately and his wife Belinda Belville, of the designers Bellville Sassoon. Lady Leicester, through her mother, is a first cousin of the interior designer Cath Kidston. She is a milliner by profession.

They have a son and three daughters together:

 Lady Hermione Belinda Coke (born 29 December 1998)
 Lady Juno Carey Coke (born 21 October 2000)
 Edward Horatio Coke, Viscount Coke (born 11 June 2003)
 Lady Elizabeth Coke (born 7 January 2006)

Notes and sources

1965 births
Living people
People educated at Eton College
People educated at Beeston Hall School
8th Earl of Leicester
Thomas Coke
Scots Guards officers
Equerries
People from Holkham

Hereditary peers elected under the House of Lords Act 1999